Neopetrosia proxima is a species of marine petrosiid sponge native to the tropical and subtropical waters of the western Atlantic Ocean.

Taxonomy
Neopetrosia proxima was originally described by the French naturalist Édouard Placide Duchassaing de Fontbressin and the Italian naturalist  in 1864 as Thalysias proxima. It was transferred from the genus Xestospongia  to Neopetrosia in 2005. It is classified under the family Petrosiidae in the order Haplosclerida.

Description
Neopetrosia proxima is externally brown, purplish brown, or maroon in coloration, while internally it is light tan. They form thick spreading masses on the substrate (usually coral rubble). The masses are highly variable in shape, with a somewhat wrinkled (rugose) surface. The surface is generally smooth in appearance, though it has the texture of fine sandpaper when touched. The consistency is hard but not brittle. It is very difficult to cut or tear and crumbles when crushed. Injured surfaces are distinctively sticky to the touch.

The spicules are composed solely of strongyles, cylindrical in shape with rounded ends.

Ecology
N. proxima serves as a host to symbiotic cyanobacteria, as well as colonies of the eusocial snapping shrimp in the genus Synalpheus.

The larvae are positively phototrophic.

Distribution
This species is found in the tropical and subtropical waters of the western Atlantic Ocean, from the Gulf of Mexico off the coast of the United States to the Caribbean Sea (including the waters off Colombia, Costa Rica,  Belize, Barbados, the Greater Antilles, Hispaniola, Panama, and the Virgin Islands). They are also found off the coasts of Brazil and Venezuela.

References

Petrosina
Fauna of the Atlantic Ocean
Animals described in 1864